Munjuluru is a village in Bantumilli mandal strategically located in the state of Andhra Pradesh of India.
The population of the village is around three thousand.

References

Villages in Krishna district